Section 320 in India defines grievous hurt. The punishment is enhanced when the hurt is grievous.

The text
The following kinds of hurt only are designated as "Grievous":
First
Emasculation
Second
Permanent privation of the sight of either eye
Third
Permanent privation of the hearing of either ear
Fourth
Privation of any member or joint
Fifth
Destruction or permanent impairing of the powers of any member or joint,
Sixth
Permanent disfiguration of the head or face
Seventh
Fracture or dislocation of a bone or tooth,
Eighth
Any hurt which endangers life or which causes the sufferer to be during the space of twenty days in severe bodily pain, or unable to follow his ordinary pursuits.

Notes

Sections of the Indian Penal Code